Gordha is a village in Kekri Tehsil of Ajmer district, Rajasthan, India.

Gordha is situated in the last end of Ajmer district, which makes a border from Bhilwara. In the sight of Siachen, the No. 2 dam of Ajmer district is located in Gordha. The foundation of this dam was laid by the then Chief Minister of Rajasthan, Shri Mohan Lal Sukkadia. There is a fame for Nadio (small dam) in Gordha.

Postal Code
There is a post office in the village and the postal code is 305407.

References

Villages in Ajmer district